Samarino is a rural locality (a village) in Andreyevskoye Rural Settlement, Alexandrovsky District, Vladimir Oblast, Russia. The population was 11 as of 2010. There are 3 streets.

Geography 
Samarino is located 8 km southeast of Alexandrov (the district's administrative centre) by road. Volodino is the nearest rural locality.

References 

Rural localities in Alexandrovsky District, Vladimir Oblast